Vladimir Karpovich Bozhko (born 16 May 1949) is a Kazakh politician, lawyer who served as the Deputy Chair of the Mazhilis from 2016 to 2020. He is the former Minister of Minister of Emergency Situations of Kazakhstan.

While Bozhko was a lieutenant general, he also graduated from the Kazakh Polytechnic Institute with a PhD in law. After graduating he worked at the Almaty electrotechnical plant. From 1976 Bozhko served in the national security bodies, where he ascended from a detective to the first vice head of the National Security Committee. Before being appointed Emergency Minister in November 2007 he served as Deputy Chairman of the National Security Committee.

References 

Кадровые назначения

1949 births
Living people
People from Almaty
Kazakhstani people of Russian descent
Ministers of Emergency (Kazakhstan)